Lathropus robustulus is a species of lined flat bark beetle in the family Laemophloeidae. It is found in North America.

References

Further reading

 
 

Laemophloeidae
Articles created by Qbugbot
Beetles described in 1916